The Ivolga (named after "иволга" bird, e.g. Eurasian golden oriole), designation EG2Tv, is an electric multiple unit passenger train produced and manufactured by Tver Carriage Works (TVZ) for urban and commuter service. 

First 2 trains were in use on Moscow railways — Novoperedelkino express route in 2017 — 2018 before extension of the Moscow Metro . Since 2018, they are working on Usovo branch of Belorussky suburban railway line in preparation for launch of Moscow Central Diameters D1 Line.

The exterior and interior styling, however, was outsourced: TVZ ordered the design of the concept train to Integral Design and Development, S.A. company (Barcelona, Spain). A natural scale mock-up was built by Integral Design and presented in Russia in 2015.

In 2017, an re-styling of this model was also outsourced to Integral Design; in 2019, first "Ivolga 2.0" train was constructed.
 Since November 2019, the upgraded models have been serving Line D1 of Moscow Central Diameters.

In 2021, yet another iteration of the design was presented, EGE2Tv aka Ivolga 3.0, with increased to 160 km/h max speed and meant for travelling longer distances. Whilst still utilizing the 2.0 exterior, the interior was updated by the Russian 2050.lab studio. They are currently meant for the new under-construction stage D3 of Moscow's MCD system planned to open in 2022-2023.

Overall 41 trains of the type were produced so far, working on lines D1 and D2 of MCD Moscow's metro-rail (high-capacity urban-rail) system as well as on express route Moscow - Usovo.

Gallery

Exterior

Interior

External links
 
 
 
Integral Design and Development: www. integraldesign.es

References

Electric multiple units of Russia
3000 V DC multiple units